Gridiron may refer to:

Sports and games 
 Gridiron, a term for the field marked with yard-lines on which American and Canadian codes of football are played
 Gridiron football, umbrella term used to refer to the several codes of football which use a gridiron field
 Gridiron (card game), a football themed collectible card game
 GridIron Master, a board game

Organizations 
 Gridiron Secret Society, a secret society at the University of Georgia
 Gridiron Club, a journalistic organization in Washington, DC, USA
 The Gridiron Club (Oxford University), an undergraduate club founded in 1884

Arts and entertainment 
 Gridiron (novel), a 1995 science fiction novel about a semi-intelligent building infected by a virus
 Captain Grid-Iron, a G.I. Joe character
 Grid Iron Theatre Company, Scottish theatre company

Other uses 
 Gridiron (cooking), a type of cooking grill
 Gridiron, Sonora, a steamboat landing in Mexico
 Gridiron plan, in urban planning
 Gridiron deck, in performance theatres, a loft floor made from girders etc. with gaps for the ropes used to lift backdrops and scenery. 
 Gridiron pendulum, a part of a pendulum clock
 Operation Flight Gridiron during World War II